Walk the Prank is an American comedy television series created by Adam Small and Trevor Moore that premiered on Disney XD on April 1, 2016. The series stars Cody Veith, Bryce Gheisar, Brandon Severs, Jillian Shea Spaeder, Chloe Guidry and Tobie Windham.

Series overview

Episodes

Season 1 (2016)

Notes

Special (2017)

Season 2 (2017–18)

Season 3 (2018)

References 

Lists of American children's television series episodes
Lists of American comedy television series episodes
Lists of Disney Channel television series episodes